Elmer Berger (May 27, 1908 – October 5, 1996) was a Jewish Reform rabbi widely known for his anti-Zionism.  He was the executive director of the American Council for Judaism from its founding in 1942 until 1955. After this time, he served as a consultant until he was forced to resign in 1968, when he founded American Jewish Alternatives to Zionism.

Family background
Berger was born in Cleveland, Ohio, the son of a Hungarian-born railroad engineer and a third generation German-American Jew born in Texas.  As a boy his family attended the Euclid Avenue Temple (Anshe Chesed Congregation) where he was encouraged to study for the rabbinate by Rabbi Louis Wolsey.  After graduating Phi Beta Kappa from the University of Cincinnati, he was ordained by Hebrew Union College in 1932.  He began his brief career in the ministry in Pontiac, Michigan before serving in Flint, Michigan from 1936 to 1942.  Berger married Seville Schwartz, the sister of a classmate at Hebrew Union College on September 3, 1931.  They divorced in 1946, and shortly thereafter he remarried to Ruth Winegarden, the daughter of a prominent furniture manufacturer who belonged to the Flint congregation.  They were married until Ruth's death in 1979.

Political activism
From the beginning, Elmer Berger was squarely in the camp of those Reform rabbis who opposed the Columbus Platform of 1937 which moderated the movement's original anti-Zionism and rejection of traditional ritual.  It was Berger's mentor, Louis Wolsey, who would in June 1942 issue a call to convene the American Council for Judaism, and who hired Berger as its first executive director.  In the organization's struggle against the Zionist program adopted at the Biltmore Conference in May 1942, Berger increasingly became the movement's public face, particularly with the publication of his book The Jewish Dilemma in 1945, which argued that Zionism was a surrender to the racial myths about the Jews and that assimilationism was still the best path for the Jews in the modern world.

Controversies
In his book The Jewish Dilemma, he also expressed support of the Soviet Union. He wrote  "..the Jews of the Soviet have enjoyed equality of status and opportunity for only about a quarter of a century. They are the most recently emancipated Jews in the world... Freedom and integration and emancipation flow now through the veins of the Jews." and that "We have seen Jews free and equal under democracy and communism. In respect to Zionism he wrote, "At a single stroke, the Revolution emancipated those very Jews for whom, previously, no solution other than Zionism would be efficacious, according to Zionist spokesmen. Soviet Jews no longer had need of Palestine- or any other refuge. The level of suffering of Russian Jewry... was gone".

In 1955, while heading ACJ, he advocated the complete assimilation of Jews into American life by switching the Jewish Sabbath from Saturday to Sunday, creating a new menorah to "reflect the appreciation of American Jews of the freedom of life in the United States," and for the interpretation of the holiday of Sukkot "to be broadened to take on meaning to [all] citizens of an industrial society."

Louis Wolsey resigned from the ACJ in 1945, but this did little to slow the activities of Berger and the ACJ, who felt that their chief purpose was to combat the influence of Zionism in the religious life of American Jews.  Murray Polner, a historian of  Judaism in the USA, has written of the ACJ: By 1948, with the establishment of an independent Israel, the council had earned the enmity of the vast majority of American Jewry, who viewed the group as indifferent, if not hostile, to Jews who had lived through the Holocaust and had nowhere to go. The ACJ is said to have had about 14,000 members in 1948.

Ostracism
Beyond 1948, Elmer Berger continued to write and lecture on behalf of the ACJ, becoming its Executive Vice President. In this position he became increasingly well known and widely despised by the Zionist camp in American Judaism, particularly after he toured the broader Middle East in 1955 and his views became increasingly identified by opponents with Arab and Palestinian causes.

After the Six-Day War in 1967, an event which swept what had previously been an arguably ambivalent American Jewish community with a massive pro-Israel fervor, Berger was widely pilloried, including by other members of the American Council for Judaism, for declaring Israel to be the principal aggressor in the conflict. This ultimately led to Berger's resignation from the Council the following year.

Later life
In 1968 he founded, with the support of some loyal friends, American Jewish Alternatives to Zionism (AJAZ), which was intended to serve only as his personal vehicle for writing and lecturing. This he continued to do actively, although in a state of semi-retirement, splitting his time between New York and Sarasota, Florida.

Elmer Berger died in Sarasota of lung cancer at the age of 88. Among his direct legacies were his close involvement with the Washington Report on Middle East Affairs and his mentorship of Middle East scholar Norton Mezvinsky, who wrote a detailed obituary for him concluding:

"Throughout his adult life Elmer Berger's definition of Judaism did not vary. In the introduction to his book A Partisan History of Judaism he wrote: "There are those who see Judaism as 'the religion of the Jewish People.' This book will not please them. For it indicates, unmistakably, that the origins of Judaism were not in 'the Jewish people' and that the best and finest of Judaism today transcends the Jewish people." At the end of this same book, Elmer Berger succinctly gave his definition: "Judaism is to do justice and to have mercy and to walk humbly with God; and all the rest is commentary and of secondary importance." It was from this perspective that Elmer Berger carefully and specifically documented his case against Zionism and against the oppressive character of the Zionist state. He called upon the state of Israel to de-Zionize, i.e. to cease being an exclusivist Jewish state granting by law rights and privileges to Jews not granted to non-Jews. He beseeched the state of Israel to develop as a truly democratic state, to be just and merciful to all people and thus to walk humbly with God.

Elmer Berger was a Jewish patriot".In 2011 a biography of Berger was published, Rabbi Outcast: Elmer Berger and American Jewish Anti-Zionism by Jack Ross.Philip Weiss, 'Rabbi outcast,' a biography of visionary anti-Zionist Elmer Berger, is coming to bookstores soon, Mondoweiss, November 25, 2010. According to the American Council for Judaism the book places liberal Jewish anti-Zionism in historical perspective. Ross' book was criticized by Lawrence Grossman, the editor of the American Jewish Year Book.

Bibliography (partial)
Elmer Berger: The Jewish Dilemma: The Case Against Zionist Nationalism, Devin-Adair, New York, 1945
Elmer Berger: A Partisan History of Judaism: The Jewish Case Against Zionism, Devin-Adair, New York, 1951
Elmer Berger: Who Knows Better Must Say So! American Council for Judaism, New York, 1955
Elmer Berger: Judaism or Jewish Nationalism: The Alternative to Zionism, Bookman Associates, 1957
Elmer Berger: Israel's Threat to Judaism: A speech delivered to the Irish Arab Society, Dublin, 5 February 1970Elmer Berger: Letters and Non-Letters: The White House, Zionism and Israel, Institute for Palestine Studies, Beirut, 1972.
Elmer Berger: Memoirs of an Anti-Zionist Jew. Institute for Palestine Studies, Beirut, 1978.
Deane A. Tack, Elmer Berger: Thorns of Resistance, Destra Publishers, 1993 
Elmer Berger: Peace for Palestine: First Lost Opportunity'', University Press of Florida Gainesville, FL 1993

Notes

References 
 American Jewish Alternatives to Zionism (New York, New York) Records at the American Jewish Historical Society at the Center for Jewish History
 American Council for Judaism
 A Tribute to Rabbi Elmer Berger, a short biography
 A Jewish Thinker in the Tradition of Humanistic Universalism by Dr. Naseer Aruri January/February 1997, pgs. 24, 84 Washington Report on Middle East Affairs

1908 births
1996 deaths
University of Cincinnati alumni
Hebrew Union College – Jewish Institute of Religion alumni
People from Flint, Michigan
Religious leaders from Cleveland
Anti-Zionist Reform rabbis
American Reform rabbis
20th-century American rabbis